Isaac Thomas Cookson (1817–1870) was a 19th-century Member of Parliament in Canterbury, New Zealand. He was a prominent merchant in early Canterbury.

Family
Cookson was born in England in 1817 and he lived in Newcastle upon Tyne. His father, Thomas Cookson (1779–1863), was from Hermitage in County Durham. His mother was Elizabeth,  Earle. On 23 February 1843, he married Janetta Maria Ridley, a daughter of Sir Matthew White Ridley, 3rd Baronet. Isaac Cookson (1679–1743) was his entrepreneurial great-great-grandfather who came to prominence in Newcastle upon Tyne.

When they arrived in New Zealand, the Cooksons had two children, a boy aged seven and a daughter aged five. Sources differ whether a further child and a newborn both died on the journey or whether one of them died just before they left England.

Colonial life

The Cookson family arrived in Canterbury's port town Lyttelton on 28 August 1851 on the Dominion from Gravesend. They first lived in London Street in Lyttelton, and sketches of their house and his office prepared by his wife are held by the National Library of New Zealand. They then moved to the Christchurch side of the Port Hills and the valley where they lived was known as Hammerton based on the name of their  property. When the Cooksons moved away after a decade, the area became known as Heathcote Valley, named after Sir William Heathcote, 5th Baronet who had been the secretary of the Canterbury Association. Cookson was a justice of the peace by 1852.

Within a month of arrival, he went into business with William Bowler in Lyttelton; his business partner would later become prominent in Wellington. In early 1852, Cookson and S. Fisher were the first to bring bees to Christchurch; they brought a hive down each from Nelson. Cookson and Bowler took up two runs in North Canterbury in mid-1852 but sold both of them a year later. The Warren was located on the south bank of the Eyre River and covered just under . Their other run, Carleton, was located between the Eyre and Cust Rivers and covered .

In 1859, Cookson was the first president of the Canterbury Chamber of Commerce.

Political career

Cookson represented the Christchurch Country electorate in 1860 following the resignation of John Ollivier, and then the Kaiapoi electorate from 1861 to 1863, when he resigned.

He was a member of the Canterbury Provincial Council and represented the Town of Lyttelton electorate (1853–1861) and then the City of Christchurch electorate (1861–1862). Cookson resigned from his political roles in October 1862 as he had received news of his only daughter Louisa having fallen seriously ill in Europe. The Superintendent of the Canterbury Province, James FitzGerald, presided over a private dinner on 13 October attended by some 60 people. The Cooksons did not get to see their daughter again as she died on 22 November 1862 in Pau in southern France.

Death
Janetta Cookson died on a journey to South America in late 1866. After leaving Saint Thomas, one of the Virgin Islands in the Caribbean Sea, she fell ill and died within a couple of days. Isaac Cookson died in England in 1870.

Footnotes

Notes

References
 
 Chapter: Carleton — (Run 34)
 Chapter: The Warren — (Run 35)
 
 
 
 
 

 

1817 births
1870 deaths
Members of the New Zealand House of Representatives
Members of the Canterbury Provincial Council
New Zealand MPs for Christchurch electorates
19th-century New Zealand politicians